Heraldry in Wales has a tradition distinct from that of English and Scottish heraldry. There is evidence that heraldry was already being used in Wales by the middle of the thirteenth century; for instance, in Gwynedd, two sons of Llywelyn the Great are recorded as having borne coats of arms in this period. Following the integration of Wales into England in the fourteenth and fifteenth centuries, the Welsh heraldic tradition became merged into that of England.

Welsh kingdoms 

Before the conquest of Gwynedd by Edward I, Wales was ruled by a number of Kings and Princes whose dominions shifted and sometimes merged following the vagaries of war, marriage and inheritance. All these Kings and Princes were ascribed personal coats of arms, often retrospectively if they lived before the dawn of heraldry, and these were borne by their descendants in Wales. The two principal Welsh kingdoms were those of Gwynedd, in the north, and Deheubarth in the south. Of these, the most successful, and the last, finally, to fall, was that of Gwynedd, and the arms now borne by the Princes of Wales as an escutcheon are the historic arms of the dynasty of Gwynedd as borne by the last native Princes of Wales, including Llywelyn the Great and Llywelyn ap Gruffudd.

The arms associated with former Kingdom of Powys are a red lion rampant on a gold field. They were used by the House of Mathrafal when Powys was an independent kingdom and later by the Earls of Powis (de la Pole and de Cherleton families) up until the late Middle Ages and can now be found on various civic coats of arms.

The arms associated with the principal dynasty of south Wales (Deheubarth) are, on the other hand, a gold lion rampant on a red field within an indented (sometimes engrailed) gold border. Although never included in the English Royal Arms, they continue to be borne by families descended from the dynasty of Deheubarth: most notably by the Talbot family (Earl of Shrewsbury, etc.) which married an heiress of the dynasty in the 14th century.

Glyndŵr Rebellion

Other Welsh heraldry

Use
 Arms of houses and of influential people are often combined, as shown in this example of the quartered arms of Hughes of Gwerclas, which gives a broad overview of Welsh heraldry. The arms are quarterly of four:
1st grand quarter, quarterly of four:
1: Kingdom of Powys Fadog;
2: Cilin ap y Blaidd Rhudd (Lord of Gest);
3: Elystan Glodrydd;
4: Tudor Trevor, Lord of Herford;
2nd grand quarter, quarterly of four:
1: Kingdom of Powys;
2: Cadwgan ap Elystan Glodrydd;
3: Kingdom of Powys Fadog;
4: Howel ap Meurig (Lord of Nannau);
3rd grand quarter, quarterly of four:
1: Roger of Bryntangor;
2: Tudor ap Griffith Vychan (Lord of Gwyddelwern);
3: Kingdom of Gwynedd;
4: Owain I ap Gruffydd;
4th grand quarter, quarterly of four:
1: Kingdom of Deheubarth (later borne by the Talbot family, Earl of Shrewsbury);
2: Philip ap Ivor (Lord of Iscoed);
3: Gruffydd ap Cynan;
4: Edwin of Tegeingl;

Key features shown are the predominance of the Welsh dragon,  the use of colour differences to distinguish branches of a family, and the use of crests. The arms here show an allegiance to both people and to Kingdoms within Wales.

Royal Badge of Wales

A new Royal Badge of Wales was approved in May 2008. It is based on the arms borne by Llywelyn the Great, the famous thirteenth century Welsh prince (blazoned quarterly Or and gules, four lions countercharged langued and armed azure), with the addition of the imperial crown atop a continuous scroll which, together with a wreath consisting of the plant emblems of the four countries of the United Kingdom, surrounds the shield. The motto which appears on the scroll, PLEIDIOL WYF I'M GWLAD (I am true to my country), is taken from the National Anthem of Wales and is also found on Welsh design £1 coins. The badge appears on the cover of Acts passed by Senedd Cymru (Welsh Parliament).

The current badge follows in a long line of heraldic devices representing Wales. Its predecessors have all been variations on either the Red Dragon, an ancient emblem revived by Henry VII, or the arms of Llywelyn.

See also 

 Welsh Seal
 List of rulers of Wales
 National symbols of Wales

References

External links

Historical marks of cadency in the royal family

 
British heraldry